Hockerton is a village and civil parish in Nottinghamshire. It is 2 miles from the town of Southwell on the A617 between Newark and Mansfield.  Fewer than 60 houses are situated around the church, the Spread Eagle pub and village hall. The population at the 2011 Census was 146. The local properties range from the carbon neutral housing of the Hockerton Housing Project to converted barns, 1960s and 1970s housing together with much older houses and a 19th-century Rectory.  The parish church of St Nicholas is Norman with an aisleless nave and a 14th-century chancel.

Part of the village contains Hockerton Housing Project. The Hockerton Housing Project is the UK's first earth sheltered, self-sufficient ecological housing development.

A group of residents formed an Industrial and Provident Society (IPS) called Sustainable Hockerton Limited in 2009. Official Web Page Sustainable Hockerton, also described by everybodys-talking Sustainable Hockerton. Sustainable Hockerton is also known as SHOCK. The Society has installed a wind turbine that generates electricity equal to that used by the village. Any surplus is distributed in the parish to promote sustainable development. By 2012 the Society had made £13,000 for the parish.

The place-name Hockerton seems to contain an Old English word for a hill, +  (Old English), an enclosure; a farmstead; a village; an estate.., so  'hill or hump settlement'.

See also
St Nicholas' Church, Hockerton

References

External links

Newark and Sherwood
Villages in Nottinghamshire